Pasi Hirvonen (born November 4, 1988) is a Finnish former professional ice hockey defenceman.

Hirvonen played 110 games in the Finnish Liiga with KalPa and TPS. He also played in Ligue Magnus in France for Rapaces de Gap and LHC Les Lions

References

External links

1988 births
Living people
Finnish ice hockey defencemen
Iisalmen Peli-Karhut players
Jokipojat players
KalPa players
LHC Les Lions players
Rapaces de Gap players
SaPKo players
HC TPS players
TuTo players
Sportspeople from Vantaa
21st-century Finnish people